Maurice Conn (1906-1973) was an American film producer, his first credit being The Fighting Trooper in 1934.   Over the next 15 years he would produce 45 films.

Filmography

(Per AFI database)

The Fighting Trooper (1934)
Wilderness Mail (1935)
Northern Frontier (1935)
Valley of Wanted Men (1935)
Men of Action (1935)
Trails of the Wild (1935)
Red Blood of Courage (1935)
His Fighting Blood (1935)
The Code of the Mounted (1935
Timber War (1935)
Black Gold (1936)
Phantom Patrol (1936)
Galloping Dynamite (1936)
Racing Blood (1936)
Song of the Trail (1936)
Headline Crasher (1936)
Wildcat Trooper (1936)
Robin Hood Jr. (1936)
Born to Fight (1936)
With Love and Kisses (1936)
Wild Horse Round-Up (1936)
Anything for a Thrill (1937)
Roaring Six Guns (1937)
Thanks for Listening (1937)
Sing While You're Able (1937)
Whistling Bullets (1937)
Valley of Terror (1937)
Young Dynamite (1937)
The Devil Diamond (1937)
The Fighting Texan (1937)
Tough to Handle (1937)
Code of the Rangers (1938)
Frontier Scout (1938) (Associate producer)
Gunsmoke Trail (1938)
The Land of Fighting Men (1938)
Phantom Ranger (1938)
West of Rainbow's End (1938)
Rough Riding Rhythm (1938)
Where the West Begins (1938)
Two Gun Justice (1938)
Dragnet (1947)
The Counterfeiters (1948)
Zamba (1949)

References

1906 births
1973 deaths
American film producers